Pseudcraspedia punctata is a species of moth of the family Erebidae first described by George Hampson in 1898. It is found in Asia including Sikkim & Karnataka, Kenya, Mauritius, Réunion, Uganda and Australia.

This species has a wingspan of 14 mm.

References 

Boletobiinae
Moths described in 1898
Moths of Africa